The Sungai Besi Expressway (Expressway 9, E9) is a controlled-access highway in the Klang Valley region of Peninsular Malaysia. The  expressway runs between Serdang and Ampang, Selangor through southeastern Kuala Lumpur, parallel and directly adjacent to the North–South Expressway and the Kuala Lumpur–Seremban Expressway.

Route background

The expressway begins at Serdang on the outskirts of Universiti Putra Malaysia, where it continues from the Kajang Dispersal Link Expressway. The expressway then runs northwards immediately east of the North–South Expressway through Seri Kembangan into Sungai Besi. The expressway continues alongside the Kuala Lumpur–Seremban Expressway, running through Bandar Tasik Selatan, Kuchai Lama, Salak South and Cheras. The expressway then diverts northeastwards to Pandan Jaya and Pandan Indah in Ampang, where it terminates.

History
Construction of the original  expressway from Jalan Istana to Serdang began in 1997, by Road Builder (M) Holdings Bhd (later acquired by IJM Corporation Berhad in 2007). The expressway used to be Selangor state road B13 and the official name was Jalan Kuala Lumpur–Sungai Besi. During construction, the status of the road was changed to a toll expressway and it was redesignated E9. The expressway commenced tolling operation on 15 May 1999.

The toll collection of Salak Jaya were abolished on 2009.

The project to upgrade the Sungai Besi interchange from a half-diamond interchange to a non-stop interchange started in 2005 and completed in 2007.

The project to upgrade the Balakong interchange from a T-junction to a directional-T interchange started in 2004 and completed in 2006.

Besraya Eastern Extension Expressway

The Besraya Eastern Extension Expressway (BEE) is an expressway in Kuala Lumpur, Malaysia connecting Salak South (North) interchange on the Kuala Lumpur Middle Ring Road 1 to the Kuala Lumpur Middle Ring Road 2 near Pandan Indah. The  extension elevated expressway has an interchanges at Salak South, Jalan Istana, Taman Ikan Emas, Jalan Loke Yew, Jalan Cheras Lama, Shamelin Perkasa, MRR2 North (where Jalan Pandan Jaya intersects the MRR2), MRR2 South (where Jalan Pandan Indah intersects the MRR2), Pandan Jaya and Jalan Pandan Utama near Pandan Indah. The expressway was opened to traffic on 15 April 2014.

History
Following the abolishment of toll collections at the Salak Jaya toll plaza on 25 February 2009, the then Works Minister, Mohd. Zin Mohamad announced the future expansion of the expressway to the Kuala Lumpur Middle Ring Road 2 near Pandan Indah, whose concession would be awarded to Besraya. The 12.3 km (7.6 mi) extension are mostly elevated. The expressway was completed on 2013 and was opened to traffic on 15 April 2014.

Toll system
As part of an initiative to facilitate faster transactions at the Mines and Loke Yew Toll Plazas, all toll transactions on the Sungai Besi Expressway have been conducted electronically via Touch 'n Go cards or SmartTAGs since 1 June 2016.

Toll rates
(Since 1 January 2023)

Mines Toll Plaza

Loke Yew Toll Plaza

List of interchanges

Main Link

Pandan Indah Link

Only major junctions are listed in these tables.

References

External links
IJM
BESRAYA
Preliminary Environmental Impact Assessment, Proposed Besraya Eastern Extension
Besraya Expressway Alignment

1999 establishments in Malaysia
Expressways in Malaysia
Expressways and highways in the Klang Valley